The Ohio class of nuclear-powered submarines includes the United States Navy's 14 ballistic missile submarines (SSBNs) and its four cruise missile submarines (SSGNs). Each displacing 18,750 tons submerged, the Ohio-class boats are the largest submarines ever built for the U.S. Navy. They are the world's third-largest submarines, behind the Russian Navy's Soviet-designed 48,000-ton  and 24,000-ton . At 24 Trident II missiles apiece, Ohio-class boats carry more missiles than either the Borei class (16, 20 by the Borei II) or the Typhoon class (20).

Like its predecessor - and  subs, the Ohio-class SSBNs are part of the United States' nuclear-deterrent triad, along with U.S. Air Force strategic bombers and intercontinental ballistic missiles. The 14 SSBNs together carry about half of U.S. active strategic thermonuclear warheads. Although the Trident missiles have no preset targets when the submarines go on patrol, they can be given targets quickly, from the United States Strategic Command based in Nebraska, using secure and constant radio communications links, including very low frequency systems.

The Ohio class is to be gradually replaced by the  beginning in 2031.

Description 
The Ohio-class submarine was designed for extended strategic deterrent patrols. Each submarine is assigned two complete crews, called the Blue crew and the Gold crew, each typically serving 70-to-90-day deterrent patrols. To decrease the time in port for crew turnover and replenishment, three large logistics hatches have been installed to provide large-diameter resupply and repair access. These hatches allow rapid transfer of supply pallets, equipment replacement modules, and machinery components, speeding up replenishment and maintenance of the submarines. Moreover, the "stealth" ability of the submarines was significantly improved over all previous ballistic-missile subs. Ohio was virtually undetectable in her sea trials in 1982, giving the U.S. Navy extremely advanced flexibility.

The class's design allows the boat to operate for about 15 years between major overhauls. Fire control for their Mark 48 torpedoes is carried out by Mark 118 Mod 2 system, while the Missile Fire Control system is a Mark 98.

The Ohio-class submarines were constructed from sections of hull, with each four-deck section being  in diameter. The sections were produced at the General Dynamics Electric Boat facility, Quonset Point, Rhode Island, and then assembled at its shipyard at Groton, Connecticut.

The US Navy has a total of 18 Ohio-class submarines which consist of 14 ballistic missile submarines (SSBNs), and four cruise missile submarines (SSGNs). The SSBN submarines provide the sea-based leg of the U.S. nuclear triad. Each SSBN submarine is armed with up to 24 Trident II submarine-launched ballistic missiles (SLBM). Each SSGN is capable of carrying 154 Tomahawk cruise missiles, plus a complement of Harpoon missiles to be fired through their torpedo tubes.

History 

The Ohio class was designed in the 1970s to carry the concurrently designed Trident submarine-launched ballistic missile. The first eight Ohio-class submarines were armed at first with 24 Trident I C4 SLBMs. Beginning with the ninth Trident submarine, the remaining boats were equipped with the larger, three-stage Trident II D5 missile. The Trident I missile carries eight multiple independently targetable reentry vehicles, while the Trident II missile carries 12, in total delivering more destructive power than the Trident I missile and with greater accuracy. This task was completed in mid-2008. The first eight submarines had their home ports at Bangor, Washington, to replace the submarines carrying Polaris A3 missiles that were then being decommissioned. The remaining 10 submarines originally had their home ports at Kings Bay, Georgia, replacing the Poseidon and Trident Backfit submarines of the Atlantic Fleet.

SSBN/SSGN conversions 

In 1994, the Nuclear Posture Review study determined that, of the 18 Ohio SSBNs the U.S. Navy would be operating in total, 14 would be sufficient for the strategic needs of the U.S. The decision was made to convert four Ohio-class boats into SSGNs capable of conducting conventional land attack and special operations. As a result, the four oldest boats of the class—Ohio, Michigan, Florida, and Georgia—progressively entered the conversion process in late 2002 and were returned to active service by 2008. The boats could thereafter carry 154 Tomahawk cruise missiles and 66 special operations personnel, among other capabilities and upgrades. The cost to refit the four boats was around US$1 billion (2008 dollars) per vessel. Further transfers occur as the strategic weapons goals of the United States change.

In 2011, Ohio-class submarines carried out 28 deterrent patrols. Each patrol lasts around 70 days. Four boats are on station ("hard alert") in designated patrol areas at any given time. From January to June 2014, Pennsylvania carried out a 140-day-long patrol, the longest to date.

The conversion modified 22 of the 24  diameter Trident missile tubes to contain large vertical launch systems, one configuration of which may be a cluster of seven Tomahawk cruise missiles. In this configuration, the number of cruise missiles carried could be a maximum of 154, the equivalent of what is typically deployed in a surface battle group. Other payload possibilities include new generations of supersonic and hypersonic cruise missiles, and Submarine Launched Intermediate Range Ballistic Missiles, unmanned aerial vehicles, the ADM-160 MALD, sensors for antisubmarine warfare or intelligence, surveillance, and reconnaissance missions, counter mine warfare payloads such as the AN/BLQ-11 Long Term Mine Reconnaissance System, and the broaching universal buoyant launcher and stealthy affordable capsule system specialized payload canisters.

The missile tubes also have room for stowage canisters that can extend the forward deployment time for special forces. The other two Trident tubes are converted to swimmer lockout chambers. For special operations, the Advanced SEAL Delivery System and the dry deck shelter can be mounted on the lockout chamber and the boat will be able to host up to 66 special-operations sailors or Marines, such as Navy SEALs, or USMC MARSOC teams. Improved communications equipment installed during the upgrade allows the SSGNs to serve as a forward-deployed, clandestine Small Combatant Joint Command Center.

On 26 September 2002, the Navy awarded General Dynamics Electric Boat a US$442.9 million contract to begin the first phase of the SSGN submarine conversion program. Those funds covered only the initial phase of conversion for the first two boats on the schedule. Advance procurement was funded at $355 million in fiscal year 2002, $825 million in the FY 2003 budget and, through the five-year defense budget plan, at $936 million in FY 2004, $505 million in FY 2005, and $170 million in FY 2006. Thus, the total cost to refit the four boats is just under $700 million per vessel.

In November 2002, Ohio entered a dry-dock, beginning her 36-month refueling and missile-conversion overhaul. Electric Boat announced on 9 January 2006 that the conversion had been completed. The converted Ohio rejoined the fleet in February 2006, followed by Florida in April 2006. The converted Michigan was delivered in November 2006. The converted Ohio went to sea for the first time in October 2007. Georgia returned to the fleet in March 2008 at Kings Bay. These four SSGNs are expected to remain in service until about 2023–2026. At that point, their capabilities will be replaced with Virginia Payload Module-equipped .

Missile tube reduction
As part of the New START treaty, four tubes on each SSBN were deactivated in 2017, reducing the number of missiles to 20 per boat.

Detailed cross-section

List of boats

Note: Boats based at Naval Base Kitsap, Washington are operated by the U.S. Pacific Fleet, while boats based at Naval Submarine Base Kings Bay, Georgia are operated by U.S. Fleet Forces Command, (formerly the U.S. Atlantic Fleet).

Replacement

The U.S. Department of Defense anticipates a continued need for a sea-based strategic nuclear force. The first of the current Ohio-class SSBNs is expected to be retired by 2029, so the replacement submarine must be seaworthy by that time. A replacement may cost over $4 billion per unit compared to Ohios $2 billion. The U.S. Navy is exploring two options. The first option is a variant of the  nuclear-powered attack submarines. The second option is a dedicated SSBN, either with a new hull or based on an overhaul of the current Ohio-class.

With the cooperation of both Electric Boat and Newport News Shipbuilding, in 2007, the U.S. Navy began a cost-control study. Then in December 2008, the U.S. Navy awarded Electric Boat a contract for the missile compartment design of the Ohio-class replacement, worth up to $592 million. Newport News is expected to receive close to 4% of that project. In April 2009, U.S. Defense Secretary Robert M. Gates stated that the U.S. Navy was expected to begin such a program in 2010. The new vessel was scheduled to enter the design phase by 2014. If a new hull design was to be used, the program needed to be initiated by 2016 to meet the 2029 deadline.

The Columbia-class was officially designated on 14 December 2016, by Secretary of the Navy Ray Mabus, and the lead submarine will be . The Navy wants to procure the first Columbia-class boat in FY2021, though it's not expected to enter service until 2031.

In 2020, Navy officials first publicly discussed the idea of extending the lives of select Ohio-class boats at the Naval Submarine League's 2020 conference. During the 2022 conference, Rear Admiral Scott Pappano, the program executive officer for strategic submarines, and Rear Admiral Douglas G. Perry, the director of undersea warfare on the Chief of Naval Operations’ staff, discussed the Columbia-class program, and also touched on the possibility of finding Ohio-class boats that had sufficient remaining nuclear fuel and were in good enough material state to be given a further extension to their lives.

In popular culture 

As ballistic-missile submarines, the Ohio class has occasionally been portrayed in fiction books and films.
 The fictional USS Montana is featured in the 1989 film The Abyss.
  is the setting for the 1995 submarine film, Crimson Tide.
 The fictional ballistic missile submarine, USS Colorado (SSBN-753), is the primary setting for the ABC television series Last Resort.
 is featured in Season 1, Episode 13 of American television series The Brave.
The Discovery Channel documentary Submarines: Sharks of Steel (1993) features USS Georgia and her crew.

See also
 List of submarine classes of the United States Navy
 List of submarines of the United States Navy
 List of submarine classes in service
 Submarines in the United States Navy
 Submarine-launched ballistic missile

References

Notes

Bibliography

Further reading

External links 

 SSBN-726 Ohio-class page on Globalsecurity.org
 
 Chonday video: The Largest Submarine in the U.S. Navy

 
Naval ships of the United States
Submarine classes
Ohio class
Nuclear-powered submarines
Ballistic missile submarines
Cruise missile submarines